The 1928 Purdue Boilermakers football team was an American football team that represented Purdue University during the 1928 college football season. In their seventh season under head coach James Phelan, the Boilermakers compiled a 5–2–1 record, finished in sixth place in the Big Ten Conference with a 2–2–1 record against conference opponents, and outscored opponents by a total of 143 to 41. Harvey S. Olson was the team captain.

Schedule

References

Purdue
Purdue Boilermakers football seasons
Purdue Boilermakers football